Jungle Blue is a 1978 American pornographic exploitation film directed by Carlos Tobalina under the pseudonym Troy Benny. The film stars Kathie Kori as Jane, a woman who journeys into the jungles of South America in search of her missing father, accompanied by explorers who secretly plan to steal jewels that they believe are being guarded by a native tribe. The other members of the cast include Nina Fause and Bill Cable.

Cast
 Kathie Kori as Jane
 Nina Fause as Silvia
 Bill Cable as Evor (credited as Bigg John)
 Iris Medina as Rosa
 Jose Ferraro as Brad Johnson
 Hank Lardner as Hank

Critical reception
Rod Barnett of Cinema Retro called the film "a damned mess from beginning to end with the only draw being the actual sex scenes." He wrote: "Everything is poorly done. The actors are mostly clueless, the script is a third-grader's idea of a dirty Tarzan story and the stupid 'steal the jewels' plot is dropped in so randomly halfway through the movie that it seems like a later addition to the whole thing."

Home media
In 2014, the film was restored and released on DVD by Vinegar Syndrome.

References

External links
 

1970s exploitation films
1970s pornographic films
American pornographic films
American sexploitation films
Films set in forests
Films set in South America
Films set in Peru
1970s English-language films
1970s American films